The 1972 Syracuse Orangemen football team represented Syracuse University during the 1972 NCAA University Division football season. The team was led by 24th-year head coach Ben Schwartzwalder and played their home games at Archbold Stadium in Syracuse, New York. The team finished with a record of 5–6.

Schedule

References

Syracuse
Syracuse Orange football seasons
Syracuse Orangemen football